Huang Fu-yuan or Frank Huang (born 10 October 1956) is a Taiwanese politician. He was the Minister of the Directorate-General of Personnel Administration of the Executive Yuan from 28 March 2012 until 20 May 2016.

Education
Huang obtained his bachelor's degree from the Department of Crime Prevention and Correction in 1978 and master's degree from the Department of Police Administration in 1983 from Central Police University. He then obtained his doctoral degree from the College of Criminal Justice of Sam Houston State University in the United States in 1993.

References

Political office-holders in the Republic of China on Taiwan
Living people
1956 births
Central Police University alumni
Sam Houston State University alumni